The DARPA Falcon Project (Force Application and Launch from Continental United States) is a two-part joint project between the Defense Advanced Research Projects Agency (DARPA) and the United States Air Force (USAF) and is part of Prompt Global Strike. One part of the program aims to develop a reusable, rapid-strike Hypersonic Weapon System (HWS), now retitled the Hypersonic Cruise Vehicle (HCV), and the other is for the development of a launch system capable of accelerating an HCV to cruise speeds, as well as launching small satellites into Earth orbit.  This two-part program was announced in 2003 and continued into 2006.

Blackswift was a project announced under the Falcon banner using a fighter-sized unmanned aircraft which would take off from a runway and accelerate to  before completing its mission and landing again. The memo of understanding (MoU) between DARPA and the USAF on Blackswift—also known as the HTV-3X—was signed in September 2007.  The Blackswift HTV-3X did not receive needed funding and was canceled in October 2008.

Current research under FALCON program is centered on X-41 Common Aero Vehicle (CAV), a common aerial platform for hypersonic ICBMs and cruise missiles, as well as civilian RLVs and ELVs. The prototype Hypersonic Technology Vehicle 2 (HTV-2) first flew on 22 April 2010; the second test flew 11 August 2011 reaching Mach 20.  Both flights ended prematurely.

Design and development

Past projects
The aim was always to be able to deploy a craft from the continental United States, which could reach anywhere on the planet within one to two hours. The X-20 Dyna-Soar in 1957 was the first publicly acknowledged program—although this would have been launched vertically on a rocket and then glided back to Earth, as the Space Shuttle did, rather than taking off from a runway. Originally, the Shuttle was envisaged as a part-USAF operation, and separate military launch facilities were built at Vandenberg AFB at great cost, though never used. After the open DynaSoar USAF program from 1957 to 1963, spaceplanes went black (became highly classified). In the mid-1960s, the CIA began work on a high-Mach spyplane called Project Isinglass. This developed into Rheinberry, a design for a Mach-17 air-launched reconnaissance aircraft, which was later canceled.

According to Henry F. Cooper, who was the Director of the Strategic Defense Initiative ("Star Wars") under President Reagan, spaceplane projects consumed $4 billion of funding in the 1970s, 1980s and 1990s (excluding the Space Shuttle). This does not include the 1950 and 1960s budgets for the Dynasoar, ISINGLASS, Rheinberry, and any 21st-century spaceplane project which might emerge under Falcon. He told the United States Congress in 2001 that all the United States had in return for those billions of dollars was "one crashed vehicle, a hangar queen, some drop-test articles and static displays". Falcon was allocated US$170 million for budget year 2008.

HyperSoar
The HyperSoar was an American hypersonic aircraft project developed at Lawrence Livermore National Laboratory (LLNL). It was to be capable of flying at around Mach 12 (9,200 mph, 14,700 km/h), allowing it to transit between any two points on the globe in under two hours. The HyperSoar was predicted to be a passenger plane capable of skipping outside the atmosphere to prevent it from burning up in the atmosphere. A trip from Chicago to Tokyo (10,123 kilometers) would take 18 skips, or 72 minutes.  It was planned to use hydrocarbon-based engines outside the atmosphere and experimental jet engine technology with testing to begin by 2010. Later, the Hypersoar concept was acquired from LLNL by DARPA, and in 2002 it was combined with the USAF X-41 Common Aero Vehicle to form the FALCON program.

FALCON
The overall FALCON (Force Application and Launch from CONtinental United States) program announced in 2003 had two major components: a small launch vehicle for carrying payloads to orbit or launching the hypersonic weapons platform payload, and the hypersonic vehicle itself.

Small Launch Vehicle
The DARPA FALCON solicitation in 2003 asked for bidders to do development work on proposed vehicles in a first phase of work, then one or more vendors would be selected to build and fly an actual launch vehicle.  Companies which won first phase development contracts of $350,000 to $540,000 in November 2003 included:
 AirLaunch LLC, Reno Nevada
 Andrews Space Inc., Seattle Washington
 Exquadrum Inc., Victorville California.
 KT Engineering, Huntsville Alabama
 Lockheed Martin Corp., New Orleans Louisiana
 Microcosm Inc., El Segundo California
 Orbital Sciences Corp., Dulles Virginia
 Schafer Corp., Chelmsford Massachusetts
 Space Exploration Technologies, Hawthorne California

Hypersonic Weapon System
The first phase of the hypersonic weapon system development was won by three bidders in 2003, each receiving a $1.2 to $1.5 million contract for hypersonic vehicle development:
 Andrews Space Inc., Seattle, Wash.
 Lockheed Martin Corp., Lockheed Martin Aeronautics Co., Palmdale, Calif.
 Northrop Grumman Corp., Air Combat Systems, El Segundo, Calif.

Lockheed Martin received the only Phase 2 HWS contract in 2004, to develop technologies further and reduce technology risk on the program.

Follow-on hypersonic program

Following the Phase 2 contract, DARPA and the US Air Force continued to develop the hypersonic vehicle platform.

The program was to follow a set of flight tests with a series of hypersonic technology vehicles.

The FALCON project includes:
 X-41 Common Aero Vehicle (CAV): a common aerial platform for hypersonic ICBMs and cruise missiles, as well as civilian RLVs and ELVs.
 Hypersonic Technology Vehicle 1 (HTV-1): a test concept, originally planned to fly in September 2007, now canceled.
 Hypersonic Technology Vehicle 2 (HTV-2): first flew on 22 April 2010, but contact was lost soon after booster separation
 HTV-3X: Blackswift, now canceled

The Hypersonic Cruise Vehicle (HCV) would be able to fly 9,000 nautical miles (17,000 km) in 2 hours with a payload of 12,000 lb (5,500 kg).  It would fly at a high altitude and achieve speeds of up to Mach 20.

Blackswift
The Blackswift was a proposed aircraft capable of hypersonic flight designed by the Lockheed Martin Skunk Works, Boeing, and ATK.

The USAF states that the "Blackswift flight demonstration vehicle will be powered by a combination turbine engine and ramjet, an all-in-one power plant. The turbine engine accelerates the vehicle to around Mach 3 before the ramjet takes over and boosts the vehicle up to Mach 6." Dr. Steven Walker, the Deputy Director of DARPA's Tactical Technology Office (acting Director as of January, 2017), will be coordinating the project. He told the USAF website,

The Falcon program has announced the hypersonic horizontal take-off Blackswift/HTV-3X.  It is also launching the HTV-2 off the top of a rocket booster.  Falcon seems to be converging from two directions, on the ultimate goal of producing a hypersonic aircraft which can take off and land from a runway in the US, and be anywhere in the world in an hour or two. Falcon is methodically proceeding toward a Hypersonic Cruise Vehicle. Dr. Walker stated,

In October 2008 it was announced that HTV-3X or Blackswift did not receive needed funding in the fiscal year 2009 defense budget and had been canceled.  The Hypersonic Cruise Vehicle program will continue with reduced funding.

Flight testing

DARPA had two HTV-2s built for two flight tests in 2010 and 2011. The Minotaur IV light rocket is the booster for the HTV-2 with Vandenberg Space Force Base (known as Vandenberg Air Force Base from 1957-2021)serving as the launch site. DARPA planned the flights to demonstrate thermal protection systems and aerodynamic control features.  Test flights were supported by NASA, the Space and Missile Systems Center, Lockheed Martin, Sandia National Laboratories and the Air Force Research Laboratory's (AFRL) Air Vehicles and Space Vehicles Directorates.

The first HTV-2 flight was launched on 22 April 2010. The launch was successful, but the first mission was not completed as planned. Reports stated that contact had been lost with the vehicle nine minutes into the mission. In mid-November, DARPA revealed that the test flight had ended when the computer autopilot had "commanded flight termination". According to a DARPA spokesman, "When the onboard system detects [undesirable or unsafe flight] behavior, it forces itself into a controlled roll and pitchover to descend directly into the ocean." Reviews found that the craft had begun to roll violently.

A second flight was launched on 11 August 2011. The unmanned Falcon HTV-2 successfully separated from the booster and entered the mission's glide phase, but again lost contact with control about nine minutes into its planned 30-minute Mach 20 glide flight. Initial reports indicated it purposely impacted the Pacific Ocean along its planned flight path as a safety precaution.  Some analysts thought that the second failure would result in an overhaul of the Falcon program.

Refocus
In July 2013, DARPA decided it would not conduct a third flight test of the HTV-2 because enough data had been collected from the first two flights, and another test was not thought to provide any more usable data for the cost.  The tests provided data on flight aerodynamics and high-temperature effects on the aeroshell.  Work on the HTV-2 would continue to summer 2014 to provide more study on hypersonic flight.  The HTV-2 was the last active part of the Falcon program.  DARPA has now changed its focus for the program from global/strategic strike to high-speed tactical deployment to penetrate air defenses and hit targets quickly from a safe distance.

See also
Boeing X-51
Prompt Global Strike, a follow-on military project
Rockwell X-30 (National AeroSpace Plane)
Lockheed Martin SR-72
Boost-glide

References

External links

 Falcon page on Darpa.mil
 HCV page on Globalsecurity.org
 "Air Drops Dummy Rocket for Darpa's Falcon", Aviation Week,
 "Hypersonics Back in the News" on Defensetech.org
 "Going Hypersonic: Flying FALCON for Defense" and "Air Force Plans Flight Tests Of Hypersonic Vehicle" on Space.com
 "Pentagon Has Far-Reaching Defense Spacecraft in Works", Washington Post, March 16, 2005
 "US hypersonic aircraft projects face change as Congress urges joint technology office", Flight International, 30 May 2006

Hypersonic aircraft
DARPA projects
Air Force Research Laboratory projects